The silkworm (Bombyx mori) is the larva or caterpillar of a moth that is very important economically as the producer of silk.

Silkworm or The Silkworm may also refer to:
 Silkworm (missile), a Chinese-built anti-ship cruise missile
 Silkworm (band), an indie rock band
 Silkworm (video game), a 1988 video game
 Brocade Communications Systems Brocade SilkWorm (computing), a make of fibre channel network switch
 The Silkworm (film), a 1973 Italian thriller film directed by Mario Sequi 
 The Silkworm, a 2014 mystery novel written by J. K. Rowling under the pen-name "Robert Galbraith"